On the Road Again is a Canadian television series which aired from 1987 until 2007. Wayne Rostad was the program's host for its entire run. The series consisted of interview and documentary segments from various Canadian locations.

CBC cancelled the series in January 2007, citing declining ratings and the network's rethinking of regional production policies.

References

1987 Canadian television series debuts
2007 Canadian television series endings
CBC Television original programming
1980s Canadian documentary television series
1990s Canadian documentary television series
2000s Canadian documentary television series